Charles John McDonald (14 June 1901 – 28 September 1978) was an Australian rules footballer who played with South Melbourne in the Victorian Football League (VFL).

McDonald later served in the Australian Army for three years during World War II.

Notes

External links 

1901 births
1978 deaths
Australian rules footballers from Victoria (Australia)
Sydney Swans players
Military personnel from Victoria (Australia)
Australian military personnel of World War II